Duncans Branch is a stream in the U.S. state of Tennessee.

A variant name was "Duncans Creek". Duncans Branch has the name of a pioneer settler.

References

Rivers of Hardin County, Tennessee
Rivers of Tennessee